Chris Cook is a senior research fellow at the Institute for Security and Resilience Studies at University College London. 
Cook was a director at the International Petroleum Exchange IPE. IPE is known for trading Brent Crude until 2005.

Biography
Cook was born in London, United Kingdom. 

Early in his career, Cook worked as a fraud investigator for the UK Department of Trade and Industry. 
 Market Regulator at the Association of Futures Brokers and Dealers
 Market Regulator at the International Petroleum Exchange (latterly as Director)
 Senior Research Fellow at the ISRS, University College, London

References

External links

 ISRS staff page of Chris Cook
 Chris Cook page at Peer to Peer Foundation
 Interview with Chris Cook, originator of the Iranian Oil Bourse
 Article 'Iran talks have the right mix for history'/Asia Times
 Slide presentation on new monetary system idea
 What comes after the dollar - energy as a currency unit

 Living people
 Academics of University College London
 Year of birth missing (living people)